The Empire School, located in rural Minidoka County, Idaho about  south of Rupert, was listed on the National Register of Historic Places in 2001.

It was built in 1917 to replace an earlier school at the same location. The building has two rooms on the first floor and a single open room on the second floor which was used for assemblies, dances, holiday parties, and community events.

See also
 List of National Historic Landmarks in Idaho
 National Register of Historic Places listings in Minidoka County, Idaho

References

Buildings and structures in Minidoka County, Idaho
National Register of Historic Places in Minidoka County, Idaho
School buildings on the National Register of Historic Places in Idaho
Schools in Idaho